Uiramutã is a municipality located in the northeast of the state of Roraima in Brazil. Its population is 10,789 (as of 2020) and its area is 8,066 km2. It is the northernmost municipality of Brazil, with Monte Caburaí being the northernmost point. West of this mountain, there is also the Monte Roraima, the tallest mountain in Roraima and in Guyana, located in the triple frontier of Brazil, Guyana and Venezuela. Still, Uiramutã holds the title of the northernmost urban seat of a municipality in Brazil. Its counterparts in the South, West and East are respectively Chuí, state of Rio Grande do Sul; Mâncio Lima, Acre; and João Pessoa, Paraíba.

The municipality is located entirely inside the Raposa Serra do Sol Indian Reservation. Because of this, its economic activities are limited. As a result, Uiramutã is also noted for being the Brazilian municipality that depends the most on government funds: 80% of its income is provided by the public administration, including social insurance and welfare programs such as the Bolsa Família.

The town of Uiramutã was established in 1911 by Severino Pereira da Silva, a gold miner, who founded the village for both the indigenous and non-indigenous community. Uiramutã became an independent municipality in 1995, and can be accessed via the RR-171 road.

Nature
The municipality contains the  Monte Roraima National Park, a protected area created in 1989.

References

External links 
 Official website (in Portuguese)
 

Municipalities in Roraima
Populated places established in 1995